Year 176 (CLXXVI) was a leap year starting on Sunday (link will display the full calendar) of the Julian calendar. At the time, it was known as the Year of the Consulship of Proculus and Aper (or, less frequently, year 929 Ab urbe condita). The denomination 176 for this year has been used since the early medieval period, when the Anno Domini calendar era became the prevalent method in Europe for naming years.

Events 
 By place 

 Roman Empire 
 November 27 – Emperor Marcus Aurelius grants his son Commodus the rank of Imperator, and makes him Supreme Commander of the Roman legions.
 December 23 – Marcus Aurelius and Commodus enter Rome after a campaign north of the Alps, and receive a triumph for their victories over the Germanic tribes.
 The Equestrian Statue of Marcus Aurelius is made. It is now kept at Museo Capitolini in Rome (approximate date).

Births 
 Fa Zheng, Chinese nobleman and adviser (d. 220)
 Liu Bian, Chinese emperor of the Han Dynasty (d. 190)
 Ma Chao, Chinese general and warlord (d. 222)

Deaths 
 Faustina the Younger, Roman empress (b. AD 130)
 Marcus Macrinius Avitus Catonius Vindex, Roman politician

References